The Sparrow target missile is an Israeli medium-range air-launched ballistic missile produced by Rafael Advanced Defense Systems. The missile is currently used as a target missile to test the Arrow anti-ballistic missile system. The missile has a modular warhead section and is capable of carrying a high-explosive warhead.

Versions 
There are three versions of the missile: Black Sparrow, Blue Sparrow, and Silver Sparrow. The Silver Sparrow version is designed to simulate Iranian Shahab-3 class ballistic missiles with a 1,500-2,000 km range.
 
The Silver Sparrow version was first tested on September 2, 2013. The launch from the Mediterranean was detected by a Russian ballistic missile early warning radar at Armavir, followed by Israeli acknowledgement of the test over an hour later.

References 

Guided missiles of Israel
Target missiles
Air-launched ballistic missiles